Serine/threonine-protein kinase 10 is an enzyme that in humans is encoded by the STK10 gene.

This gene encodes a member of the Ste20 family of serine/threonine protein kinases, and is similar to several known polo-like kinase kinases. The protein can associate with and phosphorylate polo-like kinase 1, and overexpression of a kinase-dead version of the protein interferes with normal cell cycle progression. The kinase can also negatively regulate interleukin 2 expression in T-cells via the mitogen activated protein kinase kinase 1 pathway.

References

Further reading

EC 2.7.11